Baseball at the 1951 Pan American Games was contested between teams representing Argentina, Brazil, Colombia, Cuba, Mexico, Nicaragua, United States, and Venezuela. The 1951 edition was the first Pan American Games, and was hosted by Buenos Aires.

Medal summary

Medal table

Medalists

The Wake Forest Demon Deacons baseball team represented the United States in the competition.

Sources
  .

References

1951
Baseball
Pan American Games
1951 Pan American Games